Hydrelia percandidata is a moth in the family Geometridae. It is found in Transcaucasia and the Caucasus, as well as in Iran and Turkey.

References

Moths described in 1893
Asthenini
Moths of Europe
Moths of Asia